The softball competition at the 2010 Central American and Caribbean Games was held in Mayagüez and Hormigueros, Puerto Rico. 

The men's tournament was scheduled to be held from 18–24 July at the Santiago Llorens Stadium in Mayagüez and the women's tournament was held from 23–30 July at the Julio Rivera Lopez Stadium, Hormigueros.

Medal summary

Men

Preliminary round

Medal round

Women

Preliminary round

Medal round

External links

Softball at the Central American and Caribbean Games
July 2010 sports events in North America
Events at the 2010 Central American and Caribbean Games
Softball at the Central American and Caribbean Games
Softball in Puerto Rico